Roubanis is a last name from Peloponnese. Notable people with the surname include:

 Aristidis Roubanis (1932–2018), basketball player
 Georgios Roubanis (born 1929), Pole Vaulter who won a bronze medal at the Melbourne Olympics
 Nick Roubanis, a Greek American music instructor, sometimes credited as the composer of "Misirlou"

Greek-language surnames